Eucalyptus macrandra, commonly known as long-flowered marlock, river yate or twet, is a species of mallee or small tree that is endemic to the south-west of Western Australia. It has smooth greyish bark, lance-shaped adult leaves, flower buds usually in groups of fifteen, pale yellow flowers and elongated cup-shaped to bell-shaped fruits.

Description
It has smooth, pale grey to light brown bark, sometimes with rough, blackish bark near the base. Flowering occurs from November to December or from January to April and the flowers are pale yellowish green.

Taxonomy and naming
Eucalyptus macrandra was first formally described in 1867 by George Bentham from an unpublished description by Ferdinand von Mueller. The type specimen was collected by George Maxwell "from valleys south of the Stirling range to Salt River and Phillips range" and the description was published in Flora Australiensis. The specific epithet (macrandra) means "large or long stamens".

The name twet is from the Noongar language.

Joseph Maiden reduced the species to a variety in 1911 as Eucalyptus occidentalis var. macrandra in the article 'Notes on Western Australian eucalypts, including description of new species' in the Journal of the Natural History & Science Society of Western Australia but the name change has not been accepted by the Australian Plant Census.

Distribution and habitat
Long-flowered marlock is found in a variety of soil types in areas north of Albany and favours river plains or depressions. It occurs in semi-arid regions of the south-west of the state, such as the Dryandra Woodland in the Avon Wheatbelt, Esperance Plains, Jarrah Forest and Mallee biogeographic regions.

Conservation status
This eucalypt is classified as "not threatened" in Western Australia by the Western Australian Government Department of Parks and Wildlife.

Use in horticulture
Eucalyptus macrandra is easily grown from seed, but requires good drainage and a dry, frost-free climate. It is used for bonsai, suburban street trees and is cultivated in countries outside of Australia.

Cultivated specimens

See also
List of Eucalyptus species

References

Eucalypts of Western Australia
Trees of Australia
macrandra
Myrtales of Australia
Mallees (habit)
Plants described in 1867
Taxa named by George Bentham
Taxa named by Ferdinand von Mueller